All day, all night may refer to:

24/7 service
All Day, All Night, 1997 album by Changing Faces
"All Day, All Night", a song by Stephanie Mills from the 1992 album Something Real
"All Day All Night", a song by Shinee from the 2018 album The Story of Light
"Lessons in Love (All Day, All Night)", a song by Neon Trees featuring Kaskade from the 2012 album Picture Show

See also
"All Day and All of the Night", 1964 song by The Kinks
All Day and All of the Night Remixes, 2005 EP by Flunk